The Dayton Diamonds are a charter member of the Women's Football Alliance which began play in 2008.  Based in Dayton, Ohio, home games are played on the campus of Northmont High School in nearby Clayton.

In their inaugural season, the Diamonds competed in the National Women's Football Association.

The Diamonds have partnered with The Miami County Post, a news and information website based in Troy, Ohio to rebroadcast home and road games on a taped delay.

The Diamonds remained dormant for 4 seasons and the team's fate was uncertain throughout that period. However, it was announced that they would return for the 2016 WFA season.

Season-By-Season

|-
| colspan="6" align="center" | Dayton Diamonds (NWFA)
|-
|2008 || 1 || 7 || 0 || 3rd Northern Midwest || --
|-
| colspan="6" align="center" | Dayton Diamonds (WFA)
|-
|2009 || 1 || 7 || 0 || 5th National Central || --
|-
|2010 || 0 || 8 || 0 || 3rd National Mid Atlantic || --
|-
|2011 || 0 || 8 || 0 || 3rd National North Central || --
|-
!Totals || 2 || 30 || 0
|colspan="2"|

2008

Season schedule

2009

Season schedule

2010

Season schedule

2011

Standings

Season schedule

References

External links
 Dayton Diamonds official website
 Diamonds To Be Broadcast Online

National Women's Football Association teams
Women's Football Alliance teams
American football teams in Dayton, Ohio
American football teams established in 2008
2008 establishments in Ohio
Women's sports in Ohio